Joseph McCann may refer to:

Joseph McCann (academic) (1946–2015), American academic administrator
Joseph McCann (criminal) (born 1985), British rapist
Joseph McCann (diver) (1925–1989), Australian diver